Bangladesh–Mexico relations are the bilateral relations between Bangladesh and Mexico. Both nations are members of the United Nations and the World Trade Organization.

History 

Diplomatic relations between the two countries were officially established on 8 July 1975, four years after Bangladesh obtained its independence from Pakistan. In 1981, Bangladeshi President Abdus Sattar paid a visit to Mexico to attend the North–South Summit in Cancun.

Bangladesh and Mexico have expressed mutual interest in expanding the bilateral economic activities between the two countries. In 2011, a business delegation from Bangladesh paid a visit to Mexico aimed at exploring potential fields for bilateral trade and investment. Climate change and poverty alleviation have also been identified as potential areas for bilateral cooperation between the two countries. In 2012, Bangladesh opened its first resident embassy in Mexico City. In 2015, Bangladeshi Minister of State Shahriar Alam paid a visit to Mexico to celebrate 40 years of diplomatic relations both nations. While in Mexico, Minister Alam met with Mexican Foreign Minister José Antonio Meade.

High-level visits
High-level visits from Bangladesh to Mexico

 President Abdus Sattar (1981)
 Foreign Minister Mohamed Mijarul Quayes (2011)
 Minister of State Shahriar Alam (2015)

Bilateral agreements
Both nations have signed a few bilateral agreements such as an Agreement on the Elimination of Visa for Diplomatic and Official Passport Holders (2013); Agreement on Mutual Administrative Assistance in Customs Matters (2013) and a Memorandum of Understanding on Foreign Office Consultation (2015).

Trade
In 2018, two-way trade between both nations amounted to US$336 million. Bangladesh's main exports to Mexico include: cotton, textiles and shoes. Mexico's main exports to Bangladesh include: motors for elevators or elevators; generators; shrimp and prawns; and steam traps. In 2016, Mexican multinational company Cemex, sold its operations in Bangladesh to Siam Cement Group.

Resident diplomatic missions 
 Bangladesh has an embassy in Mexico City.
 Mexico is accredited to Bangladesh from its embassy in New Delhi, India and maintains an honorary consulate in Dhaka.

References 

 
Mexico
Bilateral relations of Mexico